New City may refer to:

Places
New City, Chicago, a neighborhood of Chicago
New City, Illinois
New City, Massachusetts, former name of Hudson, Massachusetts
New City, New York
New City, Wisconsin, a ghost town
New City, Tijuana, a high-rise residential development in Tijuana
a form of subdivision of Egypt

Arts and entertainment
New City (band), a band based in Toronto, Ontario, Canada
New City (album), a 1975 album by Blood, Sweat & Tears
Newcity, an alternative weekly in Chicago

See also
List of planned cities